Abhishek Tanwar (born 17 October 1991) is an Indian cricketer. He made his Twenty20 debut for Tamil Nadu in the 2015–16 Syed Mushtaq Ali Trophy on 10 January 2016. He made his first-class debut for Tamil Nadu in the 2018–19 Ranji Trophy on 1 November 2018. He made his List A debut on 12 October 2019, for Tamil Nadu in the 2019–20 Vijay Hazare Trophy.

References

External links
 

1991 births
Living people
Indian cricketers
Tamil Nadu cricketers
People from Jamnagar